Fruto is the Spanish word for "fruit". It may refer to:
Fruto, California, in Glenn County
Emiliano Fruto, Colombian baseball player
Fruto Chamorro (1804-1855), President of Nicaragua

See also
Frutos (disambiguation)
Fructus (disambiguation)